Bass Lake is the name of several lakes in Ontario:

Bass Lake (Manitoulin District, Ontario)
Bass Lake (Rideau Lakes, Ontario) (Leeds & Grenville) 
Bass Lake (Leeds and the Thousand Islands, Ontario) (Leeds & Grenville) 
Bass Lake (Grey County, Ontario)
Bass Lake (Patterson Township, Ontario) (Parry Sound District) 
Bass Lake (Wilson Township, Ontario) (Parry Sound District) 
Bass Lake (Simcoe County, Ontario)
Bass Lake (Telfer Township, Ontario) (Sudbury District) 
Bass Lake (Mongowin Township, Ontario) (Sudbury District) 
Bass Lake (Parkin Township, Ontario) (Sudbury District) 
Bass Lake (Kilarney, Ontario) (Sudbury District) 
Bass Lake (Whitefish Lake 6, Ontario) (Sudbury District) 
Bass Lake (Haenstschel Township, Ontario) (Sudbury District)
Mass Lake (Morse Township, Ontario) (Sudbury District)  
Bass Lake (Syine Township, Ontario) (Thunder Bay District)
Bass Lake (Baril Lake) (Thunder Bay District) 
Bass Lake (Kashabowie Lake) (Thunder Bay District) 
Bass Lake (McTavish Township, Ontario) (Thunder Bay District) 
Bass Lake (Winnipeg River) (Kenora District) 
Bass Lake (Cameron Lake) (Kenora District) 
Bass Lake (Eagle Lake) (Kenora District)
Bass Lake (Gravenhurst, Ontario) (Muskoka) 
Bass Lake (Muskoka Lakes, Ontario) (Muskoka) 
Bass Lake (Valley East, Ontario) (Sudbury) 
Bass Lake (Timiskaming District, Ontario) 
Bass Lake (Striker Township, Ontario) (Algoma District)
Bass Lake (Aberdeen Township, Ontario) (Algoma District) 
Bass Lake (Peterborough County, Ontario) 
Bass Lake (Rainy River District, Ontario) 
Bass Lake (Renfrew County, Ontario) 
Bass Lake (South Frontenac, Ontario) (Frontenac County) 
Bass Lake (Central Frontenac, Ontario) (Frontenac County)

References
Place names - Geographical names search, Natural Resources Canada